Elsewhere is the second studio album of British singer/songwriter Scott Matthews, released on 25 May 2009, more than three years after his debut album Passing Stranger. The album was released on Island after the label signed Matthews when re-issuing his debut. The album contains the single "Fractured", with the video available with the iTunes download of the album.

Track listing
"Underlying Lies" – 5:26
"Jagged Melody" – 4:15
"Suddenly You Figure Out" – 4:48
"Fractured" – 4:03
"12 Harps" – 5:01
"Speeding Slowly" – 4:02
"Into The Firing Line" – 3:42
"Up On The Hill" – 5:35
"Elsewhere" – 5:02
"Fades In Vain" – 7:03
"Nothing's Quite Right Here" – 3:24
Bonus tracks (iTunes download)
"Is This Love" - 4:41

Personnel
Scott Matthews - vocals, guitars, bass, ebow guitar, mandolin, autoharp, ebow bass, hammond organ.
Sam Martin - drums, percussion.
Craig Johnson - bass guitar
Danny Keane - cello
Darren Matthews - piano
Mat Taylor - flute
Robert Plant - vocals
Gavin Monaghan - theremin and analogue synthesizer
Ray Butcher - trumpet
Richard Shrewsbury - trombone
Mark Davis - tuba
Nick Benz - French horn
Madeleine Easton - violin
Lizzie Ball - violin
Oli Langford - viola
Produced and Mixed by Gavin Monaghan and Scott Matthews
Engineered by Gavin Monaghan and Gareth Rogers
"Fractured" mixed by Tom Lord Alge
"Into the Firing line" mixed by Cenzo Townsend

References

2009 albums
Scott Matthews albums
Island Records albums